The R162 road is a regional road in Ireland, linking Monaghan Town to Navan, County Meath.

Route
Northwest to southeast the route starts in at a junction with the N54 in Monaghan, County Monaghan. It continues southwards through Ballybay before crossing into County Cavan at Shercock. 

It veers southwest through Kingscourt and enters County Meath, passing through Nobber. South of Nobber the N52 National secondary road joins it from the west and leaves eastwards at a staggered junction. (This is unusual in the R162 regional road has priority and also a much higher standard of road than the National route). 

It passes southwards through Wilkinstown, Kilberry and passes Navan Racecourse before terminating in Navan at the R147.

See also
Roads in Ireland
National primary road
National secondary road

References
Roads Act 1993 (Classification of Regional Roads) Order 2006 – Department of Transport

Regional roads in the Republic of Ireland
Roads in County Meath
Roads in County Cavan
Roads in County Monaghan